Giovanni Aldini (10 April 1762 – 17 January 1834) was an Italian physician and physicist born in Bologna. He was a brother of the statesman Count Antonio Aldini (1756–1826). He graduated in physics at University of Bologna in 1782.

He became professor of experimental physics at University of Bologna in 1798, in succession to his uncle Luigi Galvani (1737–1798).  His scientific work was chiefly concerned with galvanism, anatomy and its medical applications, with the construction and illumination of lighthouses, and with experiments for preserving human life and material objects from destruction by fire. He wrote in French and English in addition to his native Italian, and in Latin, still used in the 18th century by the scientific community. In recognition of his merits, the emperor of Austria made him a knight of the Iron Crown and a councillor of state at Milan, where he died. He bequeathed a considerable sum to found a school of natural science for artisans at Bologna.

Experiments

Aldini's most famous public demonstration of the electro-stimulation technique of deceased limbs was performed on the executed criminal George Forster at Newgate in London in 1803. The Newgate Calendar describes what happened when the galvanic process was used on the body:

Shelley's Frankenstein association

Mary Shelley (born Mary Godwin 30 August 1797) would have been only 5 years old in January 1803 when Aldini experimented on the corpse of George Foster. In her introduction to the 1831 edition of Frankenstein she does not mention Aldini, but "galvanism" was among the evening discussion topics before she experienced her "waking dream" that led to her writing. Chapter 5, the creature awakened:

References

Further reading

External links
Mark Pilkington: Sparks of Life. Article from The Guardian about Aldini's experiments on an executed criminal.
 A. Parent: Giovanni Aldini: from animal electricity to human brain stimulation. (PDF), Can J Neurol Sci. 2004 Nov;31(4):576-84.

1762 births
1834 deaths
19th-century Italian physicists
University of Bologna alumni
Academic staff of the University of Bologna
18th-century Italian physicists